Dimitar Yordanov (1 November 1929 – 25 May 1996), commonly known as Kukusha (Bulgarian: Кукуша), was a Bulgarian footballer who played as a forward. He was the top scorer of the 1960 championship (with 12 goals for Levski Sofia).

Honours

Levski Sofia

 Bulgarian champion – 1965
 Bulgarian Cup – 1956, 1957, 1959

References

Player Profile at levskisofia.info

1929 births
1996 deaths
Bulgarian footballers
Bulgaria international footballers
PFC Slavia Sofia players
Botev Plovdiv players
PFC Cherno More Varna players
PFC Levski Sofia players
FC Septemvri Sofia players
First Professional Football League (Bulgaria) players
Association football forwards